Obretenov is a surname.

A family of Bulgarian revolutionaries bear this name:
 Tonka Obretenova (1812–1893) Wife of Niho.
 Tiho Obretenov
 Nikola Obretenov (1849–1939) Son of Tiho and Tonka.
 Georgi Obretenov (after 1849–1876) Son of Tiho and Tonka.
  (1837–1894) Son of Tiho and Tonka.
 Petar Obretenov Son of Tiho and Tonka.
 Anastasiya Stoyanov Daughter of Tiho and Tonka.